Hasanabad-e Kuh Gach (also Romanized as Ḩasanābād-e Kūh Gach; also known as Ḩasanābād-e ‘Arab and Ḩasanābād) is a village in Behnamarab-e Jonubi Rural District, Javadabad District, Varamin County, Tehran Province, Iran. At the 2006 census, its population was 291, in 69 families.

References 

Populated places in Varamin County